Kocin  is a village in the administrative district of Gmina Żagań, within Żagań County, Lubusz Voivodeship, in western Poland. 

References

Kocin